Shafoot also known as shafuta, is a traditional and a very popular appetizer food in Yemen. It is typically made of lahoh (a sourdough flatbread) or shredded bread, "Haqeen" (traditional buttermilk) and Yogurt, Zhug and Leek. Shafoot is served cold as it is kept in the fridge after mixing its ingredients for some time so that the  lahoh absorbs the liquid added into it.  It is widely eaten in the North part of Yemen, especially during the month of Ramadan.

References

Yemeni cuisine
Appetizers